Samson Jackson, better known by his in-game name Lourlo, is an American professional League of Legends player who was a top laner for Dignitas Academy.

Career 

Samson "Lourlo" Jackson started gaming with World of Warcraft and has since played Hearthstone, Diablo, Bloodline Champions, and League of Legends. In 2012, he played on Severity Gaming, but it wasn't until 2014 that he joined his first serious team.

2015 Preseason 
Lourlo joined Storm in September 2014 as one of the team's founding members, along with hairyabs, mandatorycloud, xPecake, and babyeator. The team was initially going to attempt to qualify for the 2015 spring LCS via the Expansion Tournament. However, because Lourlo would not turn 17 until March 24, 2015, the team decided to keep Lourlo on the roster and play in the Challenger scene for one split instead.

2015 season 
Lourlo left Storm and later joined CLG Black after Westrice left, beginning to play for them in the second week of the NACS Spring Season. The team placed 6th and last in the season, after losing a tiebreaker game to TSM Darkness. CLG Black retained their summer season qualifier seed from having participated in the spring season, receiving a first-round bye. However, after defeating Maelstrom, they lost to Cloud9 Tempest and then to Magnetic, missing out on the NACS summer season.

2016 season 
In January, Team Liquid announced Lourlo as their top laner for the 2016 NA LCS Spring Season, filling the gap left by Quas's suspension. Liquid's spring split started out rocky, with an 0-2 first week and cumulative wins of 50% or worse after each of the first eight weeks. Eventually, their new roster started to solidify, and they climbed into a fourth-place regular-season finish, behind the newly formed and almost-undefeated Immortals, CLG, and Cloud9. Their quarterfinal series was an easy 3–0 over NRG, but in the semifinals, they lost a narrow five-game series to CLG (the eventual champions). In the fifth game, Piglet was caught out in mid-lane by a double-teleport from both Darshan and Huhi at the same time to the same ward and died. While Liquid was already behind in that game, it was this play that sealed the win for their opponents. In the third-place series against the tournament-favorite Immortals who had been knocked down in an upset by TSM, Liquid lost once again, this time 0–3, to finish the playoffs in fourth place overall and continuing their "fourth-place curse."

As Team Liquid's season seemed to be on an upswing, as they had taken MSI finalists CLG to 5 games, they boot camped in Korea in order to increase the skill of their players. During this time, Lourlo's rocky rookie split was brought into question and Team Liquid Academy top laner 'Zig' was brought to Korea to fight for his spot. Lourlo won his spot back but jungler 'Dardoch' was suspended from the team for poor behavior. Team Liquid started their season with Moon in the jungle but failed to live up to their expectation and Dardoch was brought back in. A rocky start and rising tension between coach 'Locodoco', World-Champion 'Piglet', and Dardoch caused Piglet to voluntarily leave for their Academy team, and ADC 'Fabby' was brought to their main team. With Piglet gone, Lourlo was able to establish himself with some of the best in the League as a carry top-laner and his powerful synergy with Dardoch caused them to look to claim a World's spot at the end of the season. After a rough last 2 weeks, Team Liquid finished fifth after losing a 10k gold lead against CLG which further heightened the tensions between Dardoch and Locodoco. Team Liquid was to face CLG in the first round of playoffs, when they were down 0–2, Fabby's poor performance finally caused him to be benched for unknown player 'Jynthe'. Team Liquid was only able to win one game back before losing the set. In the Regional qualifier, Dardoch was subbed out for mid-laner 'Arcsecond'. Despite having good early games against Team nV, Team Liquid lost the set 3-0 and caused them to fall short of World's again.

2020 season 
Lourlo signed with Dignitas Academy during the 2020 offseason. They finished second in the Academy regular season but placed 3rd/4th in the playoffs after losing to  Evil Geniuses Academy in the semifinals. Lourlo continued to play for Dignitas Academy for the summer but was called up to the main LCS roster after at the start of week three and played there until the end of week six. He played with Dignitas Academy for the rest of the year.

2021 season 
Lourlo continued to play with Dignitas Academy for the entirety of the 2021 competitive season. He parted ways with Dignitas at the end of the year.

References 

Team Liquid players
Living people
League of Legends top lane players
Team Liquid Academy players
Counter Logic Gaming players
American esports players
Year of birth missing (living people)